Herman E. Boldt was a member of the Wisconsin State Senate.

Biography
Boldt was born on May 13, 1865, in Sheboygan Falls, Wisconsin. He married Minni Arnoldi and had seven children. Boldt died on April 5, 1941.

Career
Boldt was a member of the Senate from 1925 to 1931. Additionally, he was the first mayor of Sheboygan Falls. He was a Republican.

References

People from Sheboygan Falls, Wisconsin
Republican Party Wisconsin state senators
Mayors of places in Wisconsin
1865 births
1941 deaths